Amundsen House may refer to:

in Norway
Roald Amundsen's Home, Uranienborg, Oslo

in the United States
Roy E. and Hildur L. Amundsen House, Gresham, Oregon
Dyre and Maria Amundsen House, Murray, Utah

See also
Roald Amundsen Pullman Private Railroad Car, Scottsdale, Arizona, listed on the National Register of Historic Places